Susmita (also spelled as Sushmita and Sushmitha and Sushmithak) is a Hindu/Sanskrit Indian feminine given name. Notable people with the name include:
Susmita Bauri (born 1975), Indian politician
Sushmita Mitra, Indian computer scientist
Sushmita Sen (born 1975), Indian actress, model and winner of the 1994 Miss Universe pageant
 Sushmitha Singha Roy (born 1984), Indian heptathlete
Susmita Bose, Indian-American scientist  and engineer, professor at Washington State University
Sushmita Mukherjee, an author and Indian actress who has starred in several Hindi movies and television shows.

Hindu given names
Indian feminine given names